Mensch Markus is a German television series, starring Markus Maria Profitlich.

See also
List of German television series

External links

2002 German television series debuts
2007 German television series endings
German comedy television series
German-language television shows
Sat.1 original programming